Longenecker is a surname. Notable people with the surname include:

Bob Longenecker (1909–2002), American talent agent and television producer
Herbert E. Longenecker (1912-2010), eleventh president of Tulane University
Joel Minnick Longenecker (1847–1906), American statesman
John Longenecker (born 1947), American film producer
Richard Longenecker, New Testament scholar
Bruce Longenecker, New Testament scholar